Texas Cookin' is the second studio album by Texas Outlaw country singer-songwriter Guy Clark, released in 1976.

It was reissued on CD by Sugar Hill. Both Old No. 1 and Texas Cookin' were re-issued on CD on the Camden label in 2001.

Track listing
All songs written by Guy Clark except as noted.
 "Texas Cookin'" – 3:50
 "Anyhow, I Love You" – 3:55
 "Virginia's Real" – 2:59
 "It's About Time" – 4:57
 "Good to Love You Lady" – 5:04
 "Broken Hearted People" – 4:45
 "Black Haired Boy" (Guy Clark, Susanna Clark) – 3:10
 "Me I'm Feelin' the Same" – 3:32
 "The Ballad of Laverne and Captain Flint" – 3:55
 "The Last Gunfighter Ballad" – 2:51

Personnel
Guy Clark – vocals, guitar
Mike Leach – bass
Jerry Kroon – drums
Larrie Londin – drums
Chip Young – guitar
Brian Ahern – guitar
Lea Jane Berinati – keyboards, piano, background vocals
David Briggs – clarinet, piano, keyboards, clavinet, background vocals
Chuck Cochran – piano
Charlie Bundy – bass, background vocals
Susanna Clark – background vocals
Sammi Smith – background vocals
Hoyt Axton – background vocals
Tracy Nelson – background vocals
Nicolette Larson – background vocals
Rodney Crowell – guitar, background vocals
Johnny Gimble – fiddle
Pete Grant – dobro, pedal steel guitar
Emmylou Harris – background vocals
Jack Hicks – banjo
Chris Laird – drums, percussion, finger cymbals
Mike Leech – bass, string arrangements
Waylon Jennings – guitar, harmony vocals
Steve Keith – fiddle
Chips Moman – guitar
Mickey Raphael – harmonica
Danny Roland – guitar, background vocals
Tommy Williams – fiddle
Byron Bach – cello
Jerry Jeff Walker – guitar, background vocals

Production notes
Neil Wilburn – producer
Gary Hobish – reissue mastering
Nathaniel Russell – reissue art director and design
Filippo Salvadori – reissue producer

Chart positions

References

External links
 LP Discography web site.

1976 albums
Guy Clark albums
RCA Records albums